Huatacondo (in Quechua: wataqunchu,  where the condor has its nest') is a Chilean town. It is located 230 km southeast of Iquique and 118 km northwest of Ollagüe, in the Tarapacá Region, Chile.

History 
It is located on the edge of the Old Way of the Inca from Arica to Quillagua and in the middle of the Pampa of the Tamarugal. Its inhabitants are Indo-Spanish mixture, due to the passage of the Spanish colonization in the early days.

In recent days, there's been high activity of drug smuggling in the area.

Economy 
At the time of the saltpeter, fruits and flowers were produced. Nowadays, the town has changed, going through a modernization in its constructions and accesses, with a semi-tropical vegetation and climate. Currently there is production of fruits and vegetables during summer period. Nearby are the petroglyphs of Tamentica,  and there are areas where the tracks of prehistoric animals were recorded.

References 

Populated places in Chile
Populated places in Tarapacá Region